The 2011–12 All-Ireland Intermediate Club Football Championship was the ninth staging of the All-Ireland Intermediate Club Football Championship since its establishment by the Gaelic Athletic Association for the 2003–04 season.

The All-Ireland final was played on 12 February 2012 at Croke Park in Dublin, between Milltown/Castlemaine and Davitts. Milltown/Castlemaine won the match by 1-13 to 1-06 to claim their first ever championship title.

References

2011 in Irish sport
2012 in Irish sport
All-Ireland Intermediate Club Football Championship
All-Ireland Intermediate Club Football Championship